Mingende is a populated place in the Chimbu Province of Papua New Guinea.  There is a rural hospital in Mingende, run by the National Catholic Health Services of Papua New Guinea.

Notes

Populated places in Chimbu Province